FC Gigant Voskresensk was a Russian football team from Voskresensk. It played professionally in 1993 and 1994. Their best result was 8th place in Zone 4 of the Russian Second Division in 1993.

Team name history
 1993: FC Viktor-Gigant Voskresensk
 1994–1998: FC Gigant Voskresensk

External links
  Team history at KLISF

Association football clubs established in 1993
Association football clubs disestablished in 1998
Defunct football clubs in Russia
Football in Moscow Oblast
1993 establishments in Russia
1998 disestablishments in Russia